C14orf119 is a protein that in humans is encoded by the c14orf119 gene. The c14orf119 protein is predicted to be localized in the nucleus. Additionally, c14orf119 expression is decreased in individuals with systemic lupus erythematosus (SLE) when compared with healthy individual and is increased in individuals with various types of lymphomas when compared to healthy individuals.

Gene 
The common aliases of c14orf119 are chromosome open reading frame 119 and My028. The gene is located on chromosome 14, with the specific location of 14q11.2. It contains two exons and covers 5.76 kb, from 23563900 to 23569660 on the forward strand. The span of the c14orf119 gene, from the start of transcription to the polyA site, is 4951 basepairs in length.

Transcripts 
The c14orf119 mRNA is composed of 2914 basepairs. C14orf119 has two isoforms, shown in the table below.

Protein 
The c14orf119 protein is composed of 140 amino acids. The molecular weight of the c14orf119 protein is approximately 16 kDa and the basal isoelectric point is 4.86. There is a long section of hydrophobic amino acids at the start of the protein. There are no additional significant compositional features of the c14orf119 protein, including charge clusters, charge runs, patterns, repetitive structures or multiplets. The primary sequence of the c14orf119 protein is as follows,

MPLESSSSMP LSFPSLLPSV PHNTNPSPPL MSYITSQEMK CILHWFANWS GPQRERFLED LVAKAVPEKL

QPLLDSLEQL SVSGADRPPS IFECQLHLWD QWFRGWAEQE RNEFVRQLEF SEPDFVAKFY QAVAATAGKD

There are two known c14orf119 protein isoforms, as shown in the table below.

Domains and motifs
There is a domain of unknown function (DUF) found in the c14orf119 protein: DUF4508 (with an E-value of 6.3e-36). This DUF is a part of a family of proteins that is found in eukaryotes and is typically between 117 and 253 amino acids in length. Additionally, there are three predicted CK2 phosphorylation sites (at positions 36, 83, and 121) within the c14orf119 protein.

Secondary structure 
The predicted secondary structure of the c14orf119 protein is largely alpha helical in content. The specific makeup of the secondary structure is as follows, alpha helices make up 38.57% of the protein (54 amino acids), extended strands make up 23.57% of the protein (33 amino acids), and random coils make up 37.86% of the protein (53 amino acids). Phryre2, a program for protein modeling, prediction, and analysis, was used to determine and model the predicted structure of the c14orf119 protein. Shown in Figure 1, Phyre2 created a model for the predicted structure of 106 (out of a total of 140) residues of the c14orf119 protein, with 79.7% confidence and 76% coverage.

Tertiary and quaternary structures 
With only two cysteines, 52 amino acids apart, found in the c14orf119 protein sequence, there were no predicted disulfide bonds in the c14orf119 protein. There are no predicted transmembrane regions or signal peptides in the c14orf119 protein.

Gene level regulation

Promoter 
The predicted promoter sequence associated with c14orf119 is 3332 bases in length. This promoter sequence has one CpG island associated with it, with a CpG count of 78 Additionally, there are a number of transcription factor binding sites associated with this promoter sequence, such as RB1, HNF4A, ETS1, and RBL2.

Expression pattern 
C14orf119 is expressed in 203 organs. The c14orf119 gene is expressed in a number of tissues and has the highest expression rates in cultured fibroblast cells, with a TPM of 75.63. There is notable decreased expression of c14orf119 in the following tissues, pancreas, bone marrow, brain, salivary glands, and the liver. Additionally, there is notable increased expression of c14orf119 in the adrenal gland, kidney, lung, prostate, thymus, white blood cells, lymph node, and thyroid. Finally, expression levels of c14orf119 decrease with the development of the kidney and increases with development of the stomach.

Transcript level regulation 
There were no predicted enhancers associated with c14orf119. There were a number of stem loop formation predictions in both the 5' UTR and 3' UTR of c14orf119.

miRNA targeting 
The miRNA binding sites found in the 3' UTR of c14orf119 include miR-489, miR-1872, and miR-4778-3p; however, there were no miRNA binding sites found in the 5' UTR of c14orf119.

Protein level regulation

Subcellular localization
The c14orf119 protein is predicted to be located in the nucleus, with a reliability score of 55.5. However, the protein has a 7.9% basic residue content and a nuclear localization signal (NLS) score of -0.47. Additionally, there was a predicted ER retention motif at positions 136-139 of the protein. Finally, there were no N-terminal signal peptides, no cleavage sites for mitochondria, no actinin-type actin-binding motifs, and no N-myristolyation pattern.

Post-translational modifications
There are a number of post-translational modifications of the c14orf119 protein, all of which are shown on the conceptual translation of c14orf119 in Figure 2.

There are predicted ubiquitination sites at lysine residues at positions 128 and 139.

There are predicted kinase-specific phosphorylation sites at serines at the following position in the c14orf119 protein sequence, 15, 19, 27, 32, 36, 81, 83, 90, and 121. Protein phosphorylation at serine residues can play critical roles in the regulation of protein function and the transmission of signals throughout the cell.

There are two N-glycosylation sites at positions 25-27 and 48–50. This type of post-translational modification plays important roles in both the structure and function of some eukaryotic proteins.

Additionally, there are predicted glycation of epsilon amino groups of lysines at the following positions, 40, 64, 69, and 139. Glycation is a process in which proteins react with reducing sugar molecules, which ultimately impairs the function and changes the characteristics of the protein.

There are also predicted mammalian mucin type GalNAc-O-glycosylation sites at the following positions, 5, 6, 7, 12, 15, 19, and 24. GalNAc-type-O-glycosylation is the attachment of a sugar molecule to the oxygen atom of serine or threonine residues in a protein. O-glycans or the sugars added to the serine or threonine, have various functions, including allowing recognition of foreign material, providing cartilage and tendon flexibility, controlling cell metabolism, and trafficking cells in the immune system.

There is a predicted SUMOylation sites at the lysine at position 139. SUMOylation is involved in transcriptional regulation, protein stability, apoptosis, nuclear-cytosolic transport, progression through the cell cycle, and response to stress.

Finally, there are predicted O-GlcNAc sites at the serines at the following position in the c14orf119 protein, 5, 6, 7, 8, and 83. This post-translational modification can play various critical roles such as, progression through the cell cycle, response to cellular stress, protein turnover, and protein stability.

Regulation of expression

Epigenetic
There are varying levels of H3K27ac, H3K4me1, and H3K4me3 throughout the c14orf119 gene. H3K4me1 has variation in signal strength among different cell lines, which may reflect differences of epigenetic landscapes in these cell lines. Additionally, there is a strong signal of H3K27ac across the majority of cell lines along the predicted promoter region. Finally, there is also a strong signal of H3K4me3 across the majority of the cell types along the predicted promoter region, with no signal variation across cell types.

Homology/evolution
C14orf119 is conserved in both vertebrates and invertebrates, however, it is not conserved in bacteria, archaea, trichoplax, plants or fungi. The c14orf119 gene is highly conserved in the mammalian orthologs, however, within the non-mammalian orthologs, there are various insertions, especially at the beginning and end of the gene. This gene does not contain any paralogs or paralogous domains.

As shown in Figure 3, the c14orf119 gene has evolved moderately quickly when compared to cytochrome c, fibrinogen alpha chain, and hemoglobin. It has evolved faster than both hemoglobin and cytochrome c, but slower than fibrinogen alpha chain.

The table below reveals the various orthologs of the c14orf119 protein. This table includes the date of divergence (DoD) from humans, in million years ago (MYA), accession number, and percent identity and similarity to humans for each ortholog.

Function/biochemistry 
The function of the c14orf119 protein is not yet well understood by the scientific community.

Interacting proteins 
There are a number predicted interacting proteins found in Y2H screens, such as exportin 1 (XPO1), ras homolog family member U (RHOU), deoxyhypusine hydroxylase/monooxygenase (DOHH), hepatocyte nuclear factor 4, alpha (HNF4A), leukocyte receptor cluster member 1 (LENG1), and ubiquitin C (UBC).

Clinical significance

Disease association 
Expression of c14orf119 is decreased in individuals with systemic lupus erythematosus (SLE) when compared with healthy individuals. Furthermore, expression of c14orf119 is increased in individuals with various types of lymphomas when compared to healthy individuals.

References 

Proteins
Genetics